Maximum-entropy random graph models are random graph models used to study complex networks subject to the principle of maximum entropy under a set of structural constraints, which may be global, distributional, or local.

Overview
Any random graph model (at a fixed set of parameter values) results in a probability distribution on graphs, and those that are maximum entropy within the considered class of distributions have the special property of being maximally unbiased null models for network inference (e.g. biological network inference). Each model defines a family of probability distributions on the set of graphs of size  (for each  for some finite ), parameterized by a collection of constraints on  observables  defined for each graph  (such as fixed expected average degree, degree distribution of a particular form, or specific degree sequence), enforced in the graph distribution alongside entropy maximization by the method of Lagrange multipliers. Note that in this context "maximum entropy" refers not to the entropy of a single graph, but rather the entropy of the whole probabilistic ensemble of random graphs.

In the two pairs of models mentioned above, an important distinction is in whether the constraint is sharp (i.e. satisfied by every element of the set of size- graphs with nonzero probability in the ensemble), or soft (i.e. satisfied on average across the whole ensemble). The former (sharp) case corresponds to a microcanonical ensemble, the condition of maximum entropy yielding all graphs  satisfying  as equiprobable; the latter (soft) case is canonical, producing an exponential random graph model (ERGM).

Canonical ensemble of graphs (general framework)
Suppose we are building a random graph model consisting of a probability distribution  on the set  of simple graphs with  vertices. The  Gibbs entropy  of this ensemble will be given by

      

We would like the ensemble-averaged values  of observables  (such as average degree, average clustering, or average shortest path length) to be tunable, so we impose  "soft" constraints on the graph distribution:

      

where  label the constraints. Application of the method of Lagrange multipliers to determine the distribution  that maximizes  while satisfying , and the normalization condition  results in the following:

      

The Erdős–Rényi model 

In the canonical framework above, constraints were imposed on ensemble-averaged quantities . Instead, we may impose a much stricter condition: every graph with nonzero probability must satisfy  exactly. Under these "sharp" constraints, the maximum-entropy distribution is determined. We exemplify this with the Erdős–Rényi model .

This is in direct analogy to the microcanonical ensemble in classical statistical mechanics, wherein the system is restricted to a thin manifold in the phase space of all states of a particular energy value.

It is well known that the entropy-maximizing distribution in the absence of external constraints is the uniform distribution over the sample space (see maximum entropy probability distribution), from which we obtain:

      

Generalizations
A variety of maximum-entropy ensembles have been studied on generalizations of simple graphs. These include, for example, ensembles of simplicial complexes, and weighted random graphs with a given expected degree sequence

See also

 Principle of maximum entropy
 Maximum entropy probability distribution
 Method of Lagrange multipliers
 Null model
 Random graph
 Exponential random graph model
 Canonical ensemble
 Microcanonical ensemble

References

Random graphs